The 7th National People's Congress was in session from 1988 to 1993. It held five sessions in this period.

Election results

Elected state leaders
In the 1st Session in 1988, the Congress elected the state leaders:
President of the People's Republic of China: Yang Shangkun
Chairman of the Standing Committee of the National People's Congress: Wan Li
Premier of the State Council: Li Peng
Chairman of the Central Military Commission: Deng Xiaoping
President of the Supreme People's Court: Ren Jianxin
Procurator-General of the Supreme People's Procuratorate: Liu Fuzhi

Congressional results

|-
! style="background-color:#E9E9E9;text-align:left;vertical-align:top;" |Parties
!style="background-color:#E9E9E9"|Seats
|-
| style="text-align:left;" |
Chinese Communist Party (中国共产党)
Revolutionary Committee of the Kuomintang (民革
China Democratic League (民盟)
China Democratic National Construction Association (民建)
China Association for Promoting Democracy (民进)
Chinese Peasants' and Workers' Democratic Party (农工民主党)
Zhigongdang of China (中国致公党)
Jiusan Society (九三学社)
Taiwan Democratic Self-Government League (台盟)
Non-partisans
| style="vertical-align:top;" |2,978
|-
|style="text-align:left;background-color:#E9E9E9"|Total
|width="30" style="text-align:right;background-color:#E9E9E9"|2,978
|}

External links
 Official website of the NPC

National People's Congresses
1988 in China